Leslie David Arthur Forrest was the Dean of Ferns from 1995 until 2011.

Leslie Forrest was born in 1946, educated at Trinity College, Dublin and ordained in 1971. After a curacy at Conwall he held incumbencies at Tullyaughnish and Galway until his appointment as Dean.

Notes

1946 births
Alumni of Trinity College Dublin
Deans of Ferns
Living people